Garachoqa (also Romanized as Garāchoqā, Garā Cheqā, and Garāchqā; also known as Kara Chaqa, Qarāchoqā, and Qāra Chūgeh) is a village in Babarashani Rural District, Chang Almas District, Bijar County, Kurdistan Province, Iran. At the 2006 census, its population was 94, in 24 families. The village is populated by Kurds.

References 

Towns and villages in Bijar County
Kurdish settlements in Kurdistan Province